Scarisbrick is a civil parish in the West Lancashire district and borough of Lancashire, England. It contains 32 buildings and structures that are recorded in the National Heritage List for England as designated listed buildings. Of these, one is listed at Grade I, the highest of the three grades, and the others are at Grade II, the lowest grade. The most significant building in the parish is Scarisbrick Hall which is listed at Grade I, with several associated structures being listed separately. The parish is a collective of smaller hamlets and is largely rural. Many of the listed buildings are houses, farmhouses or other agricultural buildings that have since been repurposed as dwellings, while the others include a telephone kiosk and the Roman Catholic Church of St Elizabeth.

Key

Buildings

See also

St Mark's Church, Scarisbrick
Listed buildings in Lancashire

References

Bibliography

Buildings and structures in the Borough of West Lancashire
Scarisbrick